Amalodeta tineoides is a moth of the subfamily Arctiinae. It is found in the Philippines.

References

Moths described in 1928
Lithosiini
Moths of Asia